The Sumrie Tournament was a professional golf tournament played at the Notts Golf Club, Kirkby in Ashfield, Nottinghamshire, England. The event was held just once, in 1968, and had total prize money of £6,000. The event was sponsored by C. & M. Sumrie Ltd of Leeds, clothing manufacturers and had a field of 100, the leading 80 in the 1967 Order of Merit and 20 invitations. The tournament was played with the bigger ball. From 1969 Sumrie sponsored a better-ball competition, the Sumrie Better-Ball.

Winners

References

Golf tournaments in England